AVigillant Carpark is the first EP by the American industrial band ATelecine, released in 2009 by Pendu Sound Recordings.

The first pressing was on clear 7" vinyl in a limited edition of 300 including a printed sheet and a sticker.

Track listing
Side A
 "Red"
 "Every Wolf Every..."
 "The Pleasure Dome"
Side B
 "Matic"
 "Larry Park"
 "Efrom (The Retarded Rabbit)"

Personnel
Pablo St. Francis: Vocals, bass, drums, dulcimer, synthesizer
Sasha Grey: Vocals, lyrics, synthesizer, drums, drumbox, tape loops, guitar
Todd Brooks: Artwork, design

References

2009 EPs
ATelecine albums